Filmmaker is a quarterly publication magazine covering issues relating to independent film. The magazine was founded in 1992 by Karol Martesko-Fenster, Scott Macaulay and Holly Willis. The magazine is now published by the IFP (Independent Filmmaker Project), which acts in the independent film community.

Background 
With a readership of more than 60,000, the magazine includes interviews, case studies, financing and distribution information, festival reports, technical and production updates, legal pointers, and filmmakers on filmmaking in their own words.

The magazine used to be available outside the US in London but has not been on sale in the UK since early 2009.

Annual features 
25 New Faces of Independent Film: Each year (typically in the Summer issue), Filmmaker publishes its list of independent film's emerging talent. The list typically contains directors, producers, actors and animators. Past lists have featured Ryan Gosling, Andrew Bujalski, Anna Boden & Ryan Fleck, Greg Pak, Oren Peli, Miranda July, Tze Chun, Jay Duplass & Mark Duplass, Zoe Kazan, Lena Dunham, Rooney Mara, Azazel Jacobs, Craig Zobel, Elliot Page, and Hilary Swank.

List of "25 New Faces of Indie Film" from 1998–2020
Sources:

1998 

 Lance Acord
 Peter Sarsgaard
 Jamie Babbit
 David Birdsell
 Darren Stein
 Hilary Brougher
 P. David Ebersole
 Christina Ray Eichman
 Matthew Irving
 Mary Kuryla
 Craig Marsden
 Sanjay Mishra
 David Munro
 Pop Will Eat Itself
 Benita Raphan
 Tami Reiker
 Greg Sax
 Shudder to Think
 Elizabeth Schub
 Cauleen Smith
 Amy Talkington
 Amy Vincent
 Lisa Wiegand
 Yvonne Welbon
 Jessica Yu

1999 

 Janet McTeer
 Matthew Libatique
 Eva Ilona Brzeski
 James Chinlund
 Nisha Ganatra
 Theodore Shapiro
 Tom Krueger
 Lindsay Jewett
 Erik Loyer
 Jim Tobias
 Tom E. Brown
 Patrick Stettner
 Karyn Kusama
 Angela Robinson
 Shari Roman & Sophia Fiennes
 David Kaplan
 Joel Hopkins
 Kurt Kuenne
 Heidi Van Lier
 Jennifer Gentile
 Hilary Swank
 Wash Westmoreland
 Tom Hodges
 Jonathan Weiss

2000 

 Tim Orr
 Alex Rivera
 Tatia Rosenthal
 Michael Pitt
 Fran Krause
 Kenya T. Tiller
 Gary Hawkins
 Isaac Webb
 Greg Pritikin
 Peter Sollett & Eva Vives
 Cintra Wilson
 David Kartch
 Anthony Hardwick
 Marlene Rhein
 Cinque Northern
 Rolf Gibbs
 Laura Colella
 Senor Amor & Danielle Luppi
 Arjun Dhasin
 Aaron Woodley
 Damani Baker
 Erin Cressida Wilson
 Bradley Rust Gray

2001 

 David Guion & Michael Handelman
 Agnieszka Wojtowicz-Vosloo
 Doug Sadler
 Ryan Gosling
 Monique Matthews
 Ari Gold
 Chris Papierniak
 Brett Vapnek
 Todd Stevens
 Kat Smith
 Don Hertzfeldt
 Paul Harrill
 Bradley Beesley
 Minh Nguyen-Vo
 Eric Deutschman
 Mike Jones
 Nicholas Hay
 David Von Ancken
 David Fickas
 Todd Hughes
 Zoe Poledouris
 Scott Coffey

2002 

 Aaron Stanford
 Judy Becker
 Steven Pippman
 Geoff Haley
 Brian To
 Garrett Scott
 J.T. Petty
 deco dawson
 Daniel Junge
 Neil Burger
 Divya Srinivasan
 Josslyn Luckett
 Lisa Collins
 Craig Brewer
 Przemyslaw Reut
 M. Stark & Jacob Meszaros
 Coleman Hough
 Grace Lee
 Justin Haythe
 Steve Beatrice
 Lucy Walker
 Nicole Cattell
 Joshua Marston
 Davidson Cole

2003 

 Tasha Oldham
 Jesse Moss
 Steven Tsuchida
 Seith Mann
 Jessica Sharzer
 Adam Bhala Lough
 Bradley Peyton
 Ben Coccio
 Tom Putnam
 Shari Frilot
 Stefan Nadelman
 Victor Viyuoh
 Patty Jenkins
 Irene Lusztig
 David Russo
 Ghazi Albuliwi
 Andrew Bujalski
 Matt Goldman
 Greg Pak
 Brett Ingram
 Matt Smith
 Elliot Greenebaum
 Jen Sachs
 Luis Carmara Silva & Gabrielle Galanter

2004 

 Miranda July
 Jacob Aaron Estes
 Marcelo Zarvos
 Ryya Elias
 Andrij Parekh
 Rosario Garcia-Montero
 Ryan Eslinger
 Ryan Johnson & Gena Levy
 Elena Elmoznino
 Cess Silvera
 Margaret Harris
 Micah Schraft & Abdi Nazemian
 Larry Blackhorse Lowe
 Ellie Lee
 Stephen Adly Guirgis
 Anna Boden & Ryan Fleck
 Kazuo Ohno
 Rania Ajami
 Mario De La Vega
 Annemarie Jacir
 Kulture Machine
 Lou Taylor Pucci

2005 

 Brent Green
 Elizabeth Chai Vasarhelyi
 Cary Joji Fukunaga
 Opa Joe Sampson
 Kyle Henry
 Keith Bearden
 Rachel Boynton
 Danielle Lurie
 Cam Archer
 Patricia Riggen
 Jake Mahaffy
 Neil Dela Llana & Ian Gamazon
 Victor Buhler
 Don Handfield
 Mary Jordan
 Stew
 Mark Banning & Mad Matthewz
 Nicholas Jarecki
 Rachel Grady & Heidi Ewing
 Oliver Cheetham
 Lori Silverbush & Michael Skolnik
 Joby Harold
 Chase Palmer
 Marshall Curry
 Elliot Page

2006 

 Olivia Thirlby
 Linas Phillips
 Ham Tran
 So Yong Kim
 Scott Z. Burns
 Antonio Campos
 Gary Huggins
 Carter Smith
 Astra Taylor
 Michele Civetta
 Esther Robinson
 Alex Karpovsky
 Aurora Guerrero
 Eunhee Cho
 Neistat Brothers
 Nee Brothers
 Pastor Brothers
 Michael Tully
 Paul Soter
 Lars Knudsen & Jay Van Hoy
 John Maringouin
 Sameh Zaobi
 Kevin Jerome Everson
 Todd Rohal
 PJ Raval

2007 

 Moon Molson
 Sophie Barthes
 Daniel Barz
 Jennifer Venditti
 Kim Reed
 Andy Blubaugh
 Azazel Jacobs
 Calvin Reeder
 Fillipe Barbosa
 Craig Zobel
 Phillip Van
 Sean Kirby
 Tze Chun
 Richard Goldgewicht & Jeremy Goldscheider
 Vicente Amorim
 M dot Strange
 Kentucker Audley
 Hope Dickson Leach
 Ronald Bronstein
 Vineet Dewan
 Georgina Lightning
 Brian M. Cassidy and Melanie Shatzky
 Jess Weixler
 Alex Holdridge
 Stephane Gauger

2008 

 Jesse Epstein
 Andrew Okpeaha MacLean 
 Tariq Tapa
 Joshua Safdie
 Ryan Bilsborrow-Koo and Zachary Lieberman
 Christina Voros
 Bent-Jorgen Perlmutt
 Jennifer Phang
 Barry Jenkins
 Shana Feste
 Daniel Robin
 Tom Quinn
 John Magary
 Oren Peli
 Matt Wolf
 Myna Joseph
 Encyclopedia Pictura
 Mark Russell
 E.E. Cassidy
 Dee Rees
 Aasif Mandvi
 David & Nathan Zellner
 Eric Latek
 Julia Leigh
 Benh Zeitlin

2009 

 Ian Olds
 Eleanor Burke & Ron Eyal 
 Nat Sanders
 Jessica Oreck
 Derek Cianfrance
 Jeff Mizushima
 Lost Zombies
 Paula Huidobro
 Steph Green
 Bradford Young
 Michael Palmieri & Donal Mosher
 Paola Mendoza
 Destin Daniel Cretton
 Morgan Jon Fox
 The Purchase Brothers
 Nicole Opper
 Asiel Norton
 Andrew T. Betzer
 Sebastián Silva
 Tina Mabry
 Frankie Latina
 Lena Dunham
 Geoff Marslett
 Rooney Mara
 Jody Lee Lipes

2010 

 Victoria Mahoney
 Alex Jablonski & Michael Totten 
 Rashaad Ernesto Green
 Sara Colangelo
 Robert Machoian & Rodrigo Ojeda-Beck
 Jason Byrne
 Trieste Kelly Dunn
 Sean Durkin
 Rebecca Richman Cohen
 Julius Onah
 Zac Stuart-Pontier
 Holden Abigail Osborne
 David Wilson
 Radical Friend (Kirby McClure & Julia Grigorian)
 Marc Fratello
 Brent Stewart
 Jade Healy
 Sultan Sharrief
 Mike Stoklasa
 Kasper Tuxen
 Susan Youssef
 Danfung Dennis
 Arielle Javitch
 Matt Porterfield
 Adam Bowers

2011 

 Alrick Brown
 Joe Nicolosi 
 Alma Har’el
 Kitao Sakurai
 David Lowery
 Eddie Alcazar
 Yance Ford
 Laura Israel
 Everynone
 Panos Cosmatos
 Sophia Takal
 Brent Bonacorso
 Mark Jackson
 Kirby Ferguson
 Damon Russell
 Gingger Shankar
 Brent Hoff
 Sheldon Candis
 Carlen Altman
 Rola Nashef
 Alison Klayman
 Rania Attieh & Daniel Garcia
 Rob Hauer
 Dean Fleischer-Camp & Jenny Slate
 Andrew S. Allen & Jason Sondhi

2012 

 Desiree Akhavan and Ingrid Jungermann
 Jonas Carpignano 
 Ian Clark
 Ryan Coogler
 Drea Cooper and Zackary Canepari
 Chris Dapkins
 Katherine Fairfax Wright and Malika Zouhali-Worrall
 Hannah Fidell
 Julia Garner
 Ian Harnarine
 Cutter Hodierne
 Alexa Karolinski
 Penny Lane and Brian Frye
 Jillian Mayer and Lucas Leyva
 Omar Mullick and Bassam Tariq
 Terence Nance
 ornana
 Julia Pott
 A. G. Rojas
 Kim Sherman
 Jason Tippet and Elisabeth Mims 
 Wu Tsang
 Patrick Wang
 Treva Wurmfeld

2013 

 Scott Blake
 Lyric R. Cabral and David Felix Sutcliff 
 Emily Carmichael
 Josephine Decker
 Anahita Ghazvinizadeh
 Mohammad Gorjestani
 Daniel Hart
 Eliza Hittman
 Boyd Holbrook
 Lou Howe
 Andrew Thomas Huang
 Elaine McMillion
 Jason Osder
 Andrew Droz Palermo
 Iva Radivojevic
 Nandan Rao
 Rodrigo Reyes
 Anna Sandilands and Ewan McNico
 Ben Sinclair and Katja Blichfeld
 Leah Shore
 Andrea Sisson and Pete Ohs 
 Jeremy Teicher
 Michael Tyburski and Ben Nabors
 Lauren Wolkstein
 Chloé Zhao

2014 

 Joe Callander
 Frances Bodomo
 Robert Eggers
 Jodie Mack
 Jessica Dimmock and Christopher LaMarca
 Bernardo Britto 
 Jamey Phillips
 Scott Cummings
 Zeek Earl and Chris Caldwell
 :: kogonada
 Josef Wladyka and Alan Blanco
 Annie Silverstein
 Matt Sobel
 Gina Telaroli 
 Ana Lily Amirpour
 Janicza Bravo 
 Lily Henderson
 Nicole Riegel
 Sean Porter
 Darius Clark Monroe
 Rich Vreeland 
 Charlotte Glynn 
 Heidi Saman 
 Dustin Guy Defa 
 Lev Kalman and Whitney Horn

2015 

 Elizabeth Lo
 Reinaldo Marcus Green
 Andrew Hasse and Megan Brooks
 Trey Edward Shults
 Khalik Allah
 Pia Borg and Edward Lawrenson 
 Pippa Bianco
 Ian Samuels
 Cecilia Aldarondo
 Anna Rose Holmer
 Ted Fendt
 Britni West
 Nick Berardini and Jamie Gonçalves
 RaMell Ross
 Tayarisha Poe
 Theo Anthony 
 Viktor Jakovleski
 Celia Rowlson-Hall
 Jimmie Fails and Joe Talbot
 Shevaun Mizrahi
 Juan Pablo Gonzalez 
 Jack Dunphy
 Anthony Onah 
 The Daniels 
 Zia Anger

2016 

 Sasha Lane
 Tom Rosenberg
 Ricardo Gaona
 Ivete Lucas and Patrick Bresnan
 Livia Ungur and Sherng-Lee Huang 
 Amman Abbasi
 T. W. Pittman and Kelly Daniela Norris 
 Jess dela Merced
 Jerónimo Rodríguez
 Graham Swon 
 Katy Grannan 
 Sonia Kennebeck
 Sabaah Folayan and Damon Davis 
 MEMORY
 Connor Jessup 
 Shawn Peters
 John Wilson 
 James N. Kienitz Wilkins
 Macon Blair
 New Media Ltd. 
 Brian McOmber
 Destini Riley and Nicholas Pilarski
 Ben Petrie

2017 

 Laura Moss
 Robin Comisar 
 Andrew Fitzgerald
 Ricky D'Ambrose
 Sam Kuhn 
 Carmine Grimaldi 
 Nellie Kluz 
 Nilja Mu'min
 Chase Whiteside and Erick Stoll 
 Elan and Jonathan Bogarin 
 Alexa Lim Haas 
 Celine Held and Logan George 
 Liza Mandleup  
 Cirocco Dunlap 
 Ana Maria Vijdea
 Beth de Araújo 
 Jonathan Olshefski
 Nabil Elderkin 
 Jessica Kingdon 
 Ilana Coleman 
 Rachel Wolther and Alex H. Fischer 
 Sofía Subercaseaux 
 Kelvin Harrison Jr. 
 Ja'Tovia Gary

2018 

 Charlotte Wells 
 Mariama Diallo 
 Daniel Goldhaber & Isa Mazzei
 Helena Howard 
 Kamau Bilal 
 Richard Van  
 Means of Production  
 Paloma Martinez 
 Carey Williams 
 Aymar Jean Christian 
 Marnie Ellen Hertzler  
 Assia Boundaoui  
 Miko Revereza
 Brad Bischoff 
 Hannah Peterson
 Sebastián Pinzón Silva 
 Jomo Fray
 Andrew Bruntel  
 Alison Nguyen  
 Sky Hopinka  
 Z Behl  
 Crystal Kayiza  
 Melika Bass 
 Meredith Zielke & Yoni Goldstein 
 Channing Godfrey Peoples

2019 

 Micaela Durand and Daniel Chew 
 Sephora Woldu 
 Andrew Patterson 
 Deniz Tortum  
 Alex Thompson and Kelly O'Sullivan  
 Alison O'Daniel   
 Diana Peralta  
 Lance Oppenheim
 Matthew Puccini 
 Meghan Fredrich 
 A.V. Rockwell   
 Lyle Mitchell Corbine Jr.   
 Bo McGuire   
 Courtney Stephens  
 Sudarshan Suresh 
 Norbert Shieh
 Michaela Olsen 
 Todd Chandler 
 Jessica Dunn Rovinelli
 Haley Elizabeth Anderson   
 Barbara Cigarroa   
 Carlo Mirabella-Davis  
 Courtney and Hillary Andujar  
 Faren Humes
 Billy Chew

2020 

 Julia Mellen
 Daniel Hymanson
 Jeannie Nguyen
 Ephraim Asili 
 Tayler Montague
 Daniel Antebi 
 Keisha Rae Witherspoon 
 Nadav Kurtz
 Isidore Bethel
 Shabier Kirchner
 Merawi Gerima  
 Orian Barki and Meriem Bennani
 Hayley Garrigus
 Iliana Sosa
 Victoria Rivera
 Christine Haroutounian
 Joie Estrella Horwitz
 Neo Sora
 Darcy McKinnon
 Emma Seligman
 Madeleine Hunt-Ehrlich
 Moara Passoni
 Nikyatu Jusu
 Rajee Samarasinghe
 Joseph Sackett

References

External links
 

1992 establishments in the United States
Film magazines published in the United States
Quarterly magazines published in the United States
Magazines established in 1992
Magazines published in New York City